Triposo is a social travel site and mobile app that uses algorithms for journey planners.

The mobile app, available for iOS and Android, shows the user recommendations on where to go depending on information they've given to the app. This includes Facebook details. The app works without internet connection; it downloads information before departure.

History
Triposo was created in 2011 by ex-Google Dutch brothers Richard Osinga and Douwe Osinga with the help of Jon Tirsen.

During development, Triposo received $3.5 million in a Series A round.

In August 2012, an upgrade to the app added location-based software that allowed the app to give recommendations based on weather, time, and other variables.

By 2015, the app had been downloaded 10 million times.

In 2013, the company tried to raise $10,000 for a wearable technology belt via crowdfunding.

Triposo was acquired by Musement in October 2017.

As of June 2021, the Triposo app was no longer available on the U.S. Apple App Store.

References

External links
 

Transport companies established in 2011
Internet properties established in 2011
Dutch travel websites
Social networking services